The Champion Trainer of flat racing in Germany is the trainer whose horses have won the most flat races during a season.

Champion Trainer (since 2003)
 2018 Markus Klug
 2017 Markus Klug
 2016 Markus Klug
 2015 Andreas Wöhler und Peter Schiergen
 2014 Markus Klug
 2013 Peter Schiergen
 2012 Roland Dzubasz
 2011 Andreas Wöhler
 2010 Christian Freiherr von der Recke
 2009 Christian von der Recke
 2008 Christian von der Recke
 2007 Christian von der Recke
 2006 Peter Schiergen
 2005 Peter Schiergen
 2004 Mario Hofer
 2003 Andreas Schütz

See also
 German flat racing Champion Jockey

References

Racehorse training awards
Horse races in Germany